The 1978 National League Championship Series was a best-of-five matchup between the West Division champion Los Angeles Dodgers and the East Division champion Philadelphia Phillies. It was the tenth ever NLCS and a rematch of the 1977 series between the same teams. The Dodgers beat the Phillies three games to one before they lost the World Series to the New York Yankees.

Summary

Los Angeles Dodgers vs. Philadelphia Phillies

Game summaries

Game 1

Because Phillies ace Steve Carlton started the NL East-clinching game a few days earlier, he was not available for the start of the series, leaving the first game to Larry Christenson. The Phillies scored the first run in the bottom of the second after Greg Luzinski hit a leadoff triple and was driven in by a sacrifice fly from Mike Schmidt. The Phillies quickly lost that lead when a double and an error by third baseman Schmidt put runners on first and second with one out for the Dodgers in the third. The Dodgers capitalized on this opportunity with an RBI single by Reggie Smith and a three run home run by Steve Garvey. The Dodgers extended their 4-1 lead in the next two innings with Davey Lopes' two-run homer in the fourth and Garvey's triple in the fifth. The Dodgers entered the bottom of the fifth with a 7-1 lead where the Phillies loaded the bases with one out and Garry Maddox drove in two runs with a single. One out later, Richie Hebner's RBI single made it 7–4 Dodgers. Steve Yeager homered off of Rawly Eastwick in the sixth to give the Dodgers the 8-4 lead. The Dodgers added another run in the ninth when Garvey hit his second homer of the night, this time off of Tug McGraw. The Phillies attempted a comback in the bottom of the ninth with a home run from Jerry Martin, but rookie Bob Welch was able to strike out Maddox looking to end the game and earn the win as the Dodgers took a 1-0 series lead.

Game 2

The Dodgers won their second straight road game in this series with a complete-game, four-hit shutout by Tommy John.  Davey Lopes's home run leading off the fourth off of Dick Ruthven made it 1–0 Dodgers. Dusty Baker doubled to lead off the next inning, then scored on Steve Yeager's one-out single. After stealing second, Yeager scored on Lopes's single to make it 3–0 Dodgers. Lopes capped the scoring in the seventh with an RBI triple off of Ron Reed as the Dodgers took a 2–0 series with the 4–0 win.

Game 3

With Steve Carlton finally available to pitch, the Phillies cut the series deficit to 2–1 at Dodger Stadium, when Carlton pitched a complete game. In the top of the second with two outs, Mike Schmidt doubled and Tim McCarver drew a walk from Don Sutton. Now with two runners on base, Ted Sizemore drove in one run with an RBI single. The next batter, starting pitcher Steve Carlton, hit a three run home run, giving himself some significant run support before his return to the mound. In the bottom of the second, with two runners on base, Bill Russell hit an RBI ground rule double, making the score 4-1 in the Phillies' favor. The next inning, Reggie Smith singled with two outs and scored on Steve Garvey's double. Then Roy Cey's RBI single made it 4-3 Phillies. In the top of the sixth inning, after an error and single put runners on first and second, Carlton gave himself more run support with a two-run single. This extended the Phillies' lead to 6-3. After a pitching change brought in Lance Rautzhan, Jerry Martin drove Carlton in with a double. In the seventh,  Tim McCarver's RBI groundout with the bases loaded made it 8–3 Phillies. The bottom of the eighth tightened the game with a solo shot from Garvey, making it 8-4. In the top of the ninth, the Phillies extended their lead with Greg Luzinski's home run off of Charlie Hough. The Dodgers were unable to come back in the bottom of the ninth, allowing Carlton to complete the game and earn the win for the Phillies.

Game 4

Facing elimination once again in Game 4, the Phillies loaded the bases with nobody out in the first inning but could not score. The Dodgers then struck first in the second inning on a double by Ron Cey and an RBI single by Dusty Baker, the first of four hits he would collect in this game.  Greg Luzinski put the Phillies back on top with a two-run homer in the third.

Cey tied it in the fourth with a home run, then Steve Garvey gave the Dodgers the lead with a homer, his fourth of the series, in the sixth. The home run was also his fifth extra base hit of the Series and tied Bob Robertson's 1971 NLCS records for home runs and extra base hits in a League Championship Series. But, Bake McBride tied it once again for the Phillies in the seventh with a home run of his own.

In the bottom of the tenth, Tug McGraw retired the first two Dodger batters, but then surrendered a walk to Cey.  Baker then hit a soft line drive to center field. Garry Maddox (who by 1978 had won the fourth of his eight gold gloves) got a late break on the ball, appeared to recover in time, but dropped the ball.  Now, Cey was on second and Baker on first.  The next batter, Bill Russell, lined a base hit to center.  With Cey running because there were two out, Maddox faced a do or die play to get the ball and fire home; Maddox charged, but the ball skipped past him, enabling Cey to score the winning run.

Composite box
1978 NLCS (3–1): Los Angeles Dodgers over Philadelphia Phillies

References

External links
 Baseball-Reference.com - 1978 NLCS
 

National League Championship Series
National League Championship Series
Los Angeles Dodgers postseason
Philadelphia Phillies postseason
National League Championship Series
National League Championship Series
National League Championship Series
1970s in Philadelphia
National League Championship Series